Cucigliana is a village in Tuscany, central Italy, administratively a frazione of the comune of Vicopisano, province of Pisa. At the time of the 2006 parish census its population was 715.

Cucigliana is about 17 km from Pisa and 4 km from Vicopisano.

References 

Frazioni of the Province of Pisa